The 2019 Vodafone Ghana Music Awards is the 20th edition of the Vodafone Ghana Music Awards held on May 18, 2019, at the Grand Arena in Accra. 2019 marked 20 years of Ghana Music Awards. The event was co-hosted by Kwami Sefa Kayi who hosted from 1999 to 2007 and Berla Mundi.

Performers

Presenters 

 John Dumelo
 Kojo Rana
 Chief Dele Mamudu
 KiDi
 Cynthia Quarcoo Jumu
Patricia Obo-Nai
 Nana Ansah Kwao
 Shirley Ayorkor Botchway
 Nacee
 Lydia Forson
 James Gardner
 Kiki Benson
 Diana Hopeson
 Abeiku Santana
 Zapp Mallet
 Lovin C
 Obour
 Nathaniel Attoh
 Mariam Owusu Poku - Miss Malaika Ghana 2018
 Zynnel Zuh
 Salma Mulmin
 Qojo Qupid

Winners and nominations
Winners highlighted in Bold

Special awards 
 Best Traditional Artiste of the Year: Kwan Pa Band
 Lifetime Achievement Award: 
Prof. Kofi Abraham
 Obouba J. A. Adofo
  Mary Ghansah
 Unsung category: Kula

Disturbance and break in the show
At the 2019 Vodafone Ghana Music Awards a fracas broke out on stage between two Ghanaian reggae and dancehall artistes Stonebwoy and Shatta Wale. Stonebwoy was announced as winner for the Reggae and Dancehall Artistes for the year. Whiles receiving his award on stage, Shatta Wale and his team approached the stage which resulted in the brawl and putting the event on hold for a few minutes for calm to prevail. During the confrontation Stonebwoy was seen wielding a gun on stage during the disturbance that night. The show was continued after the two musicians were ushered out of the room by the security at the venue. The event continued with a performance by fellow reggae and dancehall artistes from Ghana Samini. The incident further prevented the event organizers from announcing the winners for the Vodafone Most Popular Song of the Year and Artiste of the Year. The two musicians Stonebwoy and Shatta Wale has been later invited by the Ghana Police Service for interrogation.

References 

Vodafone Ghana Music Awards
2019 music awards